Brje is a settlement in the hills on the left bank of the Vipava River in the Municipality of Ajdovščina in the Littoral region of Slovenia. It is made up of eleven hamlets: Kasovlje, Nečilec, Most, Kodrovi, Pečenkovi, Martini, Mihelji, Žulji, Cinki, Furlani, and Sveti Martin.

Churches

The parish church in the settlement is dedicated to Saints Cyril and Methodius and belongs to the Koper Diocese. A second church belonging to the parish is dedicated to Saint Martin and is built on top of a hill in the hamlet of Sveti Martin, which gets its name from the church Saint Martin's Church contains ceramic artworks by Peter Černe.

Gallery

References

External links 

Brje at Geopedia

Populated places in the Municipality of Ajdovščina